Oncorhynchus is a genus of fish in the family Salmonidae; it contains the Pacific salmon and Pacific trout. The name of the genus is derived from the Greek  ὄγκος (ónkos, “lump, bend”) + ῥύγχος (rhúnkhos, “snout”), in reference to the hooked snout (the "kype") that the males develop during mating season.

Range 

Salmon and trout with native ranges in waters draining to the Pacific Ocean are members of the genus. Their range extends from Beringia southwards, roughly to Taiwan in the west and Mexico to the east.  In North America, some subspecies of O. clarkii are native in the Rocky Mountains and Great Basin, while others are native to the Rio Grande and western tributaries of the Mississippi River Basin which drain to the Gulf of Mexico, rather than to the Pacific.  Several species of Oncorhynchus have been introduced into non-native waters around the globe, establishing self-sustaining wild populations.

The six Pacific salmons of Oncorhynchus are anadromous (migratory) and semelparous (die after spawning). Migration can be affected by parasites. Infected individuals can become weak and probably have shortened lifespans. Infection with parasites creates an effect known as culling whereby fish that are infected are less likely to complete the migration. Anadromous forms of Oncorhynchus mykiss known as steelhead are iteroparous.  The coastal cutthroat trout (Oncorhynchus clarkii clarkii) is considered semi-anadromous, as it spends some time in the ocean, usually much closer to its native stream than its fully anadromous relatives.

Evolution
Several Late Miocene (about 7 million years ago (Mya)) trout-like fossils in Idaho, in the Clarkia Lake beds, appear to be of Oncorhynchus. The presence of these species so far inland established Oncorhynchus was not only present in the Pacific drainages before the beginning of the Pliocene (5–6 Mya), but also that rainbow and cutthroat trout, and Pacific salmon lineages had diverged before the beginning of the Pliocene. Consequently, the split between Oncorhynchus and Salmo (Atlantic salmon) must have occurred well before the Pliocene. Suggested dates have gone back as far as the Early Miocene (about 20 Mya). One fossil species assigned to this genus, O. rastrosus, the saber-toothed salmon (synonym Smilodonichthys), is a -long species known from Late Miocene to Pleistocene fossils.

Speciation among Oncorhynchus has been examined for decades, and a family "tree" is not yet completely developed for the Pacific salmonids. Mitochondrial DNA (mtDNA) research has been completed on a variety of Pacific trout and salmonid species, but the results do not necessarily agree with fossil research, or molecular research. Chum, pink and sockeye salmon lineages are generally agreed to have diverged in the sequence after other species. Montgomery (2000) discusses the pattern of the fossil record as compared to tectonic shifts in the plates of the Pacific Northwest of America. The (potential) divergence in Onchorhyncus lineages appear to follow the uprising of the Pacific Rim. The climatic and habitat changes that would follow such a geologic event are discussed, in the context of potential stressors leading to adaptation and speciation.

One interesting case involving speciation with salmon is that of the kokanee (landlocked) sockeye. Kokanee sockeye evolve differently from anadromous sockeye—they reach the level of "biological species". Biological species—as opposed to morphological species—are defined by the capacity to maintain themselves in sympatry as independent genetic entities. This definition can be vexing because it apparently applies only to sympatry, and this limitation makes the definition difficult to apply. Examples in Washington State, Canada, and elsewhere have two populations living in the same lake, but spawning in different substrates at different times, and eating different food sources. There is no pressure to compete or interbreed (two responses when resources are short). These types of kokanee salmon show the principal attributes of a biological species: they are reproductively isolated and show strong resources partitioning.

Decline of Oncorhynchus populations

A general decline in overall Pacific salmon populations began in the mid-19th century. As the result of western expansion and development in the U.S., experts estimate salmon populations in the Columbia River basin had been reduced to less than 20% of their pre-1850 levels by 1933. In 2008, Lackey estimated that Pacific salmon stocks in the Pacific Northwest were less than 10% of their pre-1850 numbers.  Many of the remaining salmon runs are dominated by hatchery-raised salmon, not wild salmon.  Many isolated subspecies of the Pacific trouts,  particularly those of Oncorhynchus mykiss rainbow trout and
Oncorhynchus clarki cutthroat trout have declined in their native ranges.  Many local populations or distinct population segments of anadromous forms of steelhead have declined in their native ranges.  The resulting declines have resulted in a number of populations of Oncorhynchus species or subspecies being listed as either endangered, threatened or as "Species of Special Concern" by state, federal or international authorities.  Two Oncorhynchus clarki subspecies are considered extinct.  Declines are attributed to a wide variety of causes—overfishing, habitat loss and degradation, artificial propagation, stocking, and hybridization with or competition with introduced, non-native species.  For example,  the yellowfin cutthroat trout (Oncorhynchus clarki macdonaldi) is extinct as a result of the introduction of non-native rainbow trout into its native waters.

In August 2020 researchers reported that widespread declines in Pacific salmon size resulted in substantial losses to ecosystems and people, which they estimate, and are associated with a number of factors that include climate change and competition with growing numbers of wild and hatchery salmon.

Influence of hatcheries
Declines in the abundance of wild salmon due to over fishing placed greater pressure on hatcheries to increase production and restore the wild salmon stock to supply fisheries. The problem is that hatcheries can never truly replicate the environment of wild salmon, an issue which often results in physiological and behavioral differences between wild salmon and those reared in hatcheries. These differences are often the product of genetic changes associated with inbreeding, artificial selection, and natural selection, as well as different environmental pressures acting on hatchery fish than wild populations. Due to the size selective nature of fishing favoring larger fish, a reduction in average size of the adult salmon has been observed over time. The smaller salmon make a greater proportion of the remaining individuals continuing the population, and problems arise when these hatchery-reared fish are introduced into the wild populations. Unlike wild salmon, larger salmon are selected for in hatcheries and are typically much larger than wild salmon. The result is that hatchery-produced salmon tend to out-compete wild salmon for space, food, and other resources. Some salmon species in hatcheries exhibit predatory behavior toward wild salmon because they grow to be much larger. Regardless of whether predation is observed, natural social interactions are disturbed by the release of large numbers of hatchery-reared salmon where wild populations are low because salmon in hatcheries naturally have a higher propensity towards aggressive behavior.

Overall, natural salmon populations are put at risk when hatchery-reared salmon populations are introduced due to competition for resources, predation by larger individuals, and negative social interactions that upset the natural order observed in wild salmon populations. As a result, wild salmon populations are steadily dropping as the pressure to continue breeding salmon in hatcheries increases. Conservation efforts that work to place limitations on hatcheries to increase the wild salmon populations are hindered by financial pressures because hatcheries effectively support many states economically by accounting for over 70% of the salmon harvested for recreational and commercial purposes.

Influence of overfishing
Pacific salmon are harvested throughout the world as a source of food in countries ranging from the United States to South Korea. Over the past century, Pacific salmon have been extensively fished through both recreational, artisan and commercial fishing. In fact, since the 1970s there has been a nearly threefold increase in catch of Pacific salmon. As this catch has increased, a selection of reduced body size has been observed. In Japanese chum salmon, for example, between 1970 and 1988 there has been a continuous decrease in body weight averaging between 11 and 32 percent. In part, this decline in body weight has been related to the size selective effect of fishing gear used in the harvesting of salmon populations. Salmon of larger body weight are more apt to be caught during fishing efforts, causing lower body weight to be a beneficial character trait for survival. Thus, Pacific salmon have become continuously smaller in body size. However, studies have also shown that for Pacific salmon, a larger mean size at the time of reproduction increases the survival of offspring. The life history of salmon favors delayed reproduction because fecundity increased with body size. Consequently, the smaller body size of salmon results in a negative impact on population growth by decreasing the survivability of progeny, and thus decreasing the growth rate of populations. This reduction of productivity in Pacific salmon is, in part, seeded in overfishing and has caused a reduction in population sizes throughout Pacific salmon species. Today, it seems that population numbers of Pacific salmon are on the rise; however, the consequences from the overfishing in the 70s and 80s are still being reflected, with the average body size of salmon being smaller than before the event of overfishing.

Conservation

Canadian efforts

There has been evidence that the sockeye salmon are affected by thermal conditions and their responses to temperature are relatively strong and tend to vary from region to region. Canada has also used the Species at Risk Act to recognize the importance of biological diversity when it comes to the conservation of the salmon population. This means that multiple species of salmon would be looked at when it comes to conservation as well as multiple areas that each species live in. COSEWIC, a Canadian organization for the conservation of species, has named the Interior Fraser River Coho, the Cultus Lake Sockeye, and the Sakinaw Lake Sockeye to all be endangered. In British Columbia sockeye salmon in four different watersheds were certified by the Marine Stewardship Council, or MSC, as sustainable fisheries in July 2010 and the certification is good for a period of five years. In 2011 MSC also certified the Pink Salmon Fishery and as of 2012 The Chum Salmon Fisheries started their review under the MSC to become certified as a sustainable fishery.

American efforts

The US government has been working to develop a nationwide policy for the salmon populations. The Pacific Salmon Stronghold Conservation Act was re-submitted to congress and if passed will create geographic strongholds for salmon populations. Other policies include the Wild Salmon Policy which was enacted in 2005; its number one focus is the conservation of salmon off of the coasts. Even localized policies have begun, with one in Oregon which focuses on the southernmost watershed and was approved January 2013. In the Alaskan efforts, there is evidence of eight known regional groups of survival. It is also seen that the emigration of smolts (young salmon) from freshwater to other areas such as marine areas have shown significant consequences on the survival of different salmon groups. The Alaska Department of Fish and Game first received MSC, Marine Stewardship Council, Certification in sustainable seafood back in 2000. Each certification is good for a period of five years, with yearly check ups to ensure that the fishery remains sustainable. It was renewed again in 2007, but in 2012 The ADFG left the program. The Annette Island Reserve salmon fishery is under the control of the Metlakatla Indian community and as such was not included in the previous assessments of the Alaskan fisheries. It received its sustainability certification in June 2011. The Wild Salmon Center is a nonprofit organization that works on promoting conservation efforts for salmon worldwide and in the United States; it has helped secure protected watershed areas for Russian and west coast salmon. Other efforts of the Wild Salmon Center include combating illegal fishing, maintaining sustainable fisheries, and creating local watersheds as new habitats.

Russian efforts
Poaching is a threat to Oncorhynchus salmon and steelhead populations in Russia. It is estimated that illegal catching of salmon is 1.5 times more than the reported catch. The Wild Salmon Center is working with Russian authorities to try to help improve traceability systems so that markets can distinguish between legal sustainable salmon and the illegal salmon. The Wild Salmon Center has secured some of its protected locations for the salmon populations. In efforts with the WWF, the Wild Salmon Center was also able to have a Sockeye Salmon fishery certified as completely sustainable in 2012. The Iturup Island Pink and Chum Salmon Fishery was first certified in 2009 and was the first Russian salmon fishery to receive certification in sustainability by MSC. Other fisheries that were certified by MSC include the Northeast Sakhalin Island Pink Salmon, certified in June 2012, and the Ozernaya River Sockeye Salmon, certified in September 2012. The Aniva Bay Pink Salmon and the Sakhalin Island Pink salmon are both under review by the MSC.

Introductions and aquaculture

Several species of Oncorhynchus have been successfully introduced into non-native waters, establishing self-sustaining wild populations.  The Rainbow Trout Oncorhynchus mykiss is the most widely introduced species of the genus.  Rainbow Trout, Chinook Salmon Oncorhynchus tshawytscha and Coho Salmon Oncorhynchus kisutch have established wild, self-sustaining populations in the Great Lakes and Chinook in New Zealand (known there as quinnat, king or spring salmon). Aquaculture of Chinook and Coho salmon and Rainbow Trout are major industries in Chile and Australia.  Chinook from Chile were released into Argentinean rivers and there were stockings of Coho and Sockeye Salmon and Rainbow Trout in Patagonia.

Species
Some of the species in this genus are highly variable and a number of now-obsolete taxa have been described. In 1989, morphological and genetic studies by  Gerald Smith and Ralph Stearley indicated that trouts of the Pacific basin were genetically closer to Pacific salmon (Onchorhynchus species) than to the Salmos – brown trout (Salmo trutta) or Atlantic salmon (Salmo salar) of the Atlantic basin.  Thus, in 1989, taxonomic authorities moved the Rainbow, Cutthroat and other Pacific basin trouts into the genus Oncorhynchus.  Currently, 12 species and numerous subspecies in this genus are recognized: Behnke (2002).

Notes

References
  (2002): Trout and Salmon of North America. Free Press, 2002.
  (2002): Osteichthyes. In: A compendium of fossil marine animal genera. Bulletin of American Paleontology 364: 560. HTML fulltext
  (1993): Phylogeny of the Pacific trout and salmon (Oncorhynchus) and the genera of family Salmonidae. Transactions of the American Fisheries Society 122(1): 1-33.  HTML fulltext
  (2005) The distribution of Pacific salmon (Oncorhynchus spp.) in the Canadian western Arctic. http://www.dfo-mpo.gc.ca/Library/321160.pdf

External links

 British Columbia Salmon Farmer's Association
 Global Aquaculture Alliance
US mulls Pacific salmon fishing ban
Watershed Watch Salmon Society A British Columbia advocacy group for wild salmon
Wild Salmon in Trouble: The Link Between Farmed Salmon, Sea Lice and Wild Salmon - Watershed Watch Salmon Society. Animated short video based on peer-reviewed scientific research, with subject background article Watching out for Wild Salmon.
Aquacultural Revolution: The scientific case for changing salmon farming - Watershed Watch Salmon Society. Short video documentary. Prominent scientists and First Nation representatives speak their minds about the salmon farming industry and the effects of sea lice infestations on wild salmon populations.

 
Taxa named by George Suckley
Ray-finned fish genera
Extant Miocene first appearances